1950 Orange Bowl was the sixteenth edition of the bowl game, played at Burdine Stadium in Miami, Florida, on Monday, January 2, 1950. The game featured the Kentucky Wildcats of the Southeastern Conference and the Santa Clara Broncos, an independent from northern California.

Santa Clara (7–2–1) was ranked fifteenth in the final AP poll, released in early December. Kentucky  had been ranked as high as sixth in the AP poll during the season but was ranked eleventh  entering the game.

The Game
The game was scoreless until the second quarter, following a Santa Clara turnover, as Kentucky's John Netoskie recovered a fumble   A 14-play, 51-yard drive ended with a touchdown from two yards out by Wilbur Jamerson; Bobby Brooks' point after gave Kentucky a  a score that stood at the half after a 45-yard Babe Parilli-to-Bill Leskovar pass put Kentucky on the Santa Clara 3-yard line with Santa Clara stopping two rushing attempts as time expired.  Kentucky coach Bear Bryant later said he should have called a passing play in order to allow for a field goal attempt if a touchdown was not scored.

In the third quarter, a poor 9-yard Kentucky punt gave Santa Clara possession on their own 46-yard line.  John Pasco threw 25 yards to Larry Williams, which led to a one-yard touchdown run by Pasco to tie the game   A second Santa Clara touchdown came after a pass interference call against Kentucky helped set up a 4-yard touchdown run by Hall Haynes.

Early in the fourth quarter, Parilli threw a 52-yard touchdown pass to Emery Clark but Brooks missed the point after, and Santa Clara retained a one-point lead  with twelve minutes remaining.

Bill Leskovar had 83 rushing yards (on 22 carries) for Kentucky.

Aftermath
Reportedly, part of the reason the Wildcats lost was from fatigue of being overworked in two-a-day practices every day from the moment the team got off the plane in Cocoa Beach two weeks prior up until the day before the game (with the exception of Christmas Eve and Day). Bryant later admitted it wasn't the greatest coaching move of his career and refused to lay any blame on his players for the loss.

It was Santa Clara's third and final bowl win; they later played in Division II, then dropped the football program after the 1992 season.

References

Orange Bowl
Orange Bowl
Kentucky Wildcats football bowl games
Santa Clara Broncos football bowl games
January 1950 sports events in the United States
Orange Bowl